Diego Hernandez (born 1986/87) is an American Democratic politician who served in the Oregon House of Representatives from 2017 to 2021. He represented the 47th district, which covers parts of east Portland.

Biography
Hernandez graduated from Reynolds High School in Troutdale, and graduated with a bachelor's degree from the University of Oregon and with a master's degree from Portland State University. He became a teacher and was elected to the Reynolds School District Board in 2012, becoming its first Hispanic member, on which he still serves despite being elected to the House. Hernandez was appointed to the Oregon Commission on Hispanic Affairs in 2014.

Hernandez was elected to the House in 2016 to succeed the retiring Jessica Vega Pederson, defeating Independent Party of Oregon candidate Michael Langley with 67% of the vote.

Hernandez was accused of sexual harassment by seven women and has been asked to resign. After facing an investigation by Legislation, he was set to face a vote on expulsion. He announced his resignation on February 22, 2021, before the vote could take place, though he remained in office until his resignation became effective on March 15, 2021.

Personal life
Hernandez, who was 29 at the time of election, was the youngest person serving in the Oregon legislature. He is unmarried. He is now using the alias "Juan Hernandez".

References

External links
 Campaign website
 Legislative website
 School board website

1980s births
Living people
Democratic Party members of the Oregon House of Representatives
School board members in Oregon
Politicians from Portland, Oregon
21st-century American politicians
Hispanic and Latino American state legislators in Oregon
Portland State University alumni
University of Oregon alumni